Makrana marble is a type of white marble, popular for use in sculpture and building decor. It is mined in the town of Makrana in Rajasthan, India, and was used in the construction of several iconic monuments such as the Taj Mahal in Agra and the Victoria Memorial in Kolkata. The Makrana Marble is listed as a Global Heritage Stone Resource by International Union of Geological Sciences

Geology
In the Makrana area, marble is found as five steeply-dipping bands. They form part of the Ajmer Formation of the Delhi Supergroup, which is a sequence of sedimentary rocks that was deposited in the Delhi Basin during the Proterozoic. About 1450 Ma (million years ago) these rocks were affected by the Delhi Orogeny, causing the metamorphism that transformed the original limestones to marble and the folding that caused the steep dip and the current outcrop pattern.

Properties
Makrana is regarded as the oldest place in India with a marble quarry. Upon mining, Makrana marble is not subjected to any form of treatment, but used in cutting and chiseling straight away. Makrana marble is one of the two calcitic marble varieties in India, with all others being dolomitic. It has two varieties: white and albeta. The quantity of marble reserves in the region is estimated to be 55 million tonnes by the state government. About 120 thousand tonnes of the marble are produced annually from over 400 mines in the region.

Makrana marble has a high percentage of calcium and is therefore resistant to water seepage. The water absorption of Makrana marble is said to be the lowest among all types in India, and the marble is claimed to contain 98 percent of calcium carbonate and only two percent of impurities, this property of Makrana marble helps it to stay the same proportion of white for a long period of time and because it contains 98 percent of calcium the polish of this marble is considered in the best. The different shades of Makrana marble are pure white, white with grey shades and white with pink shades, depending on the level of impurities. The close interlocking property of the marble makes it strong, hard and translucent. It is said to retain its shine and white color for a long period of time.

Types of Makrana Marble
Makrana Marbles splits into various categories according to its design and pattern. The following are the exclusive marbles that are mined and manufactured at Makrana.

Makrana White Marble 

This marble is highly used in residential & commercial buildings and numerous temples, mosques, churches, and monuments, it can be used for decorative purpose in houses, hotels, corporate offices and Restaurants, western and Indian sculptures, handicrafts. 

Brown Albeta Marble  

This marble stone is a calcite stone. It is a milky white marble and also available in grey and panther brown pattern. The stone is available in various forms such as natural blocks, large & small slabs, regular tiles. 

Dungri Marble 

This is one of the oldest and finest quality marble of makrana based mines. This stone is widely used in flooring, and wall cladding due to its special qualities like no chemical reinforcement, no color changes, and no pin holes.

Albeta Marble 

This is one of the best as well as highly recommended stone for floor designs which gives luxury look to the home. Its color is milky white with a brown texture.

Pink Marble 

Because of the stunning pink color it is used for decorative purposes in houses.
Also, this is one of the most popular marble types. 

Makrana Green Marble 

This type of Makrana marble is known for its unique green color and delicate veining. It is perfect for creating a serene and natural atmosphere in any room. It is often used in bathrooms, kitchens, and living rooms.

Makrana Khandela Marble 

This type of Makrana marble is known for its unique yellow and white veining. It is perfect for creating a warm and inviting atmosphere in any room.

Notable monuments and buildings

Prominent buildings/monuments that used Makrana marble in their construction are:

 Taj Mahal, Agra, India
 Victoria Memorial, Kolkata, India – Makrana marble was chosen over various other European types in the construction of the Victoria Memorial, after several tests concluded Makrana marble to be superior. Sir Thomas Henry Holland, a British geologist, was given credit for recommending the use of Makrana marble in the construction of Victoria Memorial.
 Jaswant Thada, Jodhpur, India
 Sheikh Zayed Mosque, Abu Dhabi, UAE
 Moti Masjid, Lahore, Pakistan
 Dukhnivaran Sahib Gurdwara, Ludhiana, India

Use and export
Marble from Makrana is exported overseas mainly to the Persian Gulf countries, the European Union, Southeast Asia, Canada, Pakistan and Russia. In India, it is mainly used for handicraft and sculpture work, apart from construction of buildings. Makrana marble was given the geographical indication status in 2015 by the Geographical Indication Registry, Chennai.

References

Marble
Mining in Rajasthan
Nagaur district
Geographical indications in Rajasthan